Qingzhuhu is a subdistrict of Kaifu District, Changsha, Hunan, China. Located on the east bank of Xiang River, Qingzhuhu is bordered by Dingziwan Subdistrict of Wangcheng District and Beishan Town of Changsha County to the north, Shaping Subdistrict to the east, Xiufeng Subdistrict to the south, Baishazhou and Dazehu Subdistricts across the Xiang river to the west. The subdistrict contains 11 communities, its administrative center is at Qiaotouyi.

References

Kaifu District
Kaifu District